Tülallar (also, Tulalar, Tülalar, and Tulallar) is a village and municipality in the Goygol Rayon of Azerbaijan.  It has a population of 207.

References 

Populated places in Goygol District